The 1984–85 Fulham RLFC season was the fifth in the club's history. They competed in the 1984–85 Second Division of the Rugby Football League. They also competed in the 1984–85 Challenge Cup, 1984–85 Lancashire Cup and the 1984–85 League Cup. They finished the season in 8th place in the second tier of British professional rugby league.

1984-85 Second Division table

1984-85 squad

References

External links
Rugby League Project

London Broncos seasons
London Broncos season
1984 in rugby league by club
1984 in English rugby league
London Broncos season
1985 in rugby league by club
1985 in English rugby league